Dan Shilon (born October 24, 1940) is an Israeli television host, director, and producer.

Media career
Dan Shilon began his career in the 1960s with Israel Radio, was a correspondent of Kol Israel (Voice of Israel), and was a journalist for Yediot Ahronoth.  He also was the General Manager of the Israeli television company Reshet (רשת), a franchisee of Channel 2 on Israeli television, until he resigned in 1988.

In 1988, after political opponents Yitzhak Shamir and Shimon Peres debated each other, leftist Mapam politician Meir Pa'il, opined:  "Neither is qualified to lead Israel. [Shamir] is complete square and [Peres] is a shifty mediocrity. [Dan Shilon] is more intelligent than both of them, and Shilon is no Rambam."

Shilon hosted an Israeli late-night television talk show about political and social issues on Channel 2 on Israeli TV, which was very popular in the early 1990s, known as The Dan Shilon Show or Dan Shilon Live.  It was the Israeli equivalent of The Phil Donahue Show.  The show features both liberal and conservative Israeli public figures as guests, and dealt with controversial topics.

In 1998, Prime Minister Benjamin Netanyahu's spokesman accused him of "crossing the lines" of appropriate journalistic behavior, and taking a stand against Netanyahu.

See also
Television in Israel
Media of Israel

References

1940 births
People from Tel Aviv
Israeli journalists
Israeli television presenters
Israeli television directors
Israeli television producers
Israeli radio presenters
Israeli television talk show hosts
People from Caesarea, Israel
People from Zikhron Ya'akov
Living people